was the pen-name of a journalist, political theorist and statesman in Meiji-period Japan. His major contribution was the popularization of the egalitarian doctrines of the French philosopher Jean-Jacques Rousseau in Japan. As a result, Nakae is thought to have been a major force in the development of liberalism in early Japanese politics.

Biography
Nakae was born in Kōchi, Tosa Domain (present day Kōchi Prefecture). His father was an ashigaru, or lower ranking foot soldier in the service of the Yamauchi clan of Tosa. Having displayed an early aptitude for Western learning, after studies at the domain academy, Nakae was selected to study French and Dutch at Nagasaki and Edo. Later, he worked as a translator for the French minister to Japan, Léon Roches.

After the Meiji Restoration, he was selected as a member of the Iwakura Mission and travelled abroad (under the patronage of the Justice Ministry) to study philosophy, history, and French literature in France, where he lived from 1871 until 1874. While in France, Nakae translated some of the works of Jean-Jacques Rousseau into Japanese (most importantly, Rousseau’s "Du contrat social") and Eugène Véron's L'esthétique. He joined Saionji Kinmochi at Emile Acollas' Law School for foreign students in Paris.

Upon his return to Japan, Nakae served as a lower-ranked secretary of the Genrōin. However, he soon became disenchanted by corruption and factionalism in Japanese government, and resigned to devote himself to other literary and educational activities.

In 1874, he established his own French language school. In 1881, he helped to start the daily newspaper, through which he propagated Western democratic ideas. The newspaper was soon suppressed by the authorities for propagation of republicanism and lese majesty. The newspaper reemerged as the milder  the following year with Nakae as its chief editor. The newspaper continued to attack factionalism and corruption in government, and to agitate for revision of the unequal treaties and the rapid implementation of an elected national assembly. In 1887, Nakae was sentenced to exile from Tokyo under the Peace Preservation Law for publishing critical articles about the Meiji oligarchy. Nakae was pardoned after the promulgation of the Meiji Constitution in 1889, and he and his family moved back to Tokyo in October of that year.

During the 1890 General Election, Nakae successfully ran for a seat in the lower house of the Diet of Japan from the Osaka 4th District. He allied with Itagaki’s Jiyūto political party, and its successor, the Rikken Jiyūtō, establishing a newspaper, Rikken Jiyūtō Shinbun, as the party’s official mouthpiece. However, Nakae soon became disenchanted with the domination of the Jiyūtō by members of the former Tosa clan, and its blind opposition to policies of the Chōshū-dominated government. He left government for health reasons and for alcoholism, and retired to Hokkaidō, where he again established a newspaper. He ran for office again in the 1892 General Election, and after re-election was a strong supporter of railroad development.

Nakae continued to write, despite poverty and illness, until his death of esophageal cancer in 1901. His grave is at Aoyama Cemetery, Tokyo.

Works
 A Discourse by Three Drunkards on Government

Notes

See also 
Fukuzawa Yukichi
Natsume Sōseki
Susumu Nishibe
Tsuneari Fukuda
Yamamoto Tsunetomo

References
 Eddy Dufourmont, Rousseau et la première philosophie de la liberté en Asie (1874-1890): Nakae Chômin, Le Bord de l'eau, 2021.
 Dufourmont, Eddy. (2010).  "Is Confucianism philosophy ? The answers of Inoue Tetsujirô and Nakae Chômin," in Whither Japanese Philosophy? (Nakajima Takahiro ed.), UTCP Booklet 14, p. 71-89.
 Dufourmont, Eddy. (2009).  "The Spirit of Parody: Nakae Chōmin and the 'Philosophy of Joy',: in Whither Japanese Philosophy? (Nakajima Takahiro ed.), UTCP Booklet 11, p. 81-89.
Hane, Mikiso. Modern Japan: A Historical Survey. Westview Press (2001). 
Hotta Eri. Pan-Asianism and Japan’s War of 1931-1945. Pan-Asianism and Japan's War 1931-1945. Palgrave Macmillan (2007). 
 Jansen, Marius B. (2000). The Making of Modern Japan. Cambridge: Harvard University Press. ;  OCLC 44090600
Najita, Tetsuo. Japan: The Intellectual Foundations of Modern Japanese Politics. University of Chicago Press (1998).

Further reading

External links

National Diet Library Bio

People of Meiji-period Japan
Japanese philosophers
Japanese political journalists
1901 deaths
1847 births
People from Kōchi, Kōchi
Deaths from cancer in Japan
Deaths from esophageal cancer
19th-century Japanese people
Members of the House of Representatives (Empire of Japan)
Liberal Party (Japan, 1881) politicians
Burials in Japan